Pelahatchie is a town in Rankin County, Mississippi, United States. The town's population was 1,334 at the 2010 census. It is part of the Jackson, Mississippi Metropolitan Statistical Area. Its zip code is 39145.

History
Pelahatchie was founded in 1850, and named after Pelahatchie Creek.
The name Pelahatchie is derived from the Native American term meaning "crooked creek". The town was the bright spot in the county during the late 1800s mainly due to the railroad access in the heart of town. 
Pelahatchie is home to both a public school, Pelahatchie Attendance Center (Chiefs), and a private school, East Rankin Academy (Patriots).

Geography

Demographics

2020 census

As of the 2020 United States census, there were 1,272 people, 613 households, and 489 families residing in the town.

2000 census
As of the census of 2000, there were 1,461 people, 525 households, and 387 families residing in the town. The population density was 454.0 people per square mile (175.2/km). There were 585 housing units at an average density of 181.8 per square mile (70.1/km). The racial makeup of the town was 61.12% White, 36.82% African American, 0.14% Asian, 0.96% from other races, and 0.96% from two or more races. Hispanic or Latino of any race were 4.52% of the population.

There were 525 households, out of which 30.9% had children under the age of 18 living with them, 47.2% were married couples living together, 20.6% had a female householder with no husband present, and 26.1% were non-families. 22.9% of all households were made up of individuals, and 9.9% had someone living alone who was 65 years of age or older. The average household size was 2.77 and the average family size was 3.22.

In the town, the population was spread out, with 26.2% under the age of 18, 10.9% from 18 to 24, 28.1% from 25 to 44, 23.6% from 45 to 64, and 11.2% who were 65 years of age or older. The median age was 35 years. For every 100 females, there were 92.7 males. For every 100 females age 18 and over, there were 93.9 males.

The median income for a household in the town was $31,597, and the median income for a family was $37,313. Males had a median income of $28,145 versus $20,813 for females. The per capita income for the town was $14,950. About 11.5% of families and 16.0% of the population were below the poverty line, including 21.9% of those under age 18 and 27.6% of those age 65 or over.

Education
The Town of Pelahatchie is served by the Rankin County School District.

Public schools
 Pelahatchie Elementary School (Grades K-6)
 Pelahatchie Attendance Center (Grades 7–12).

Private schools
East Rankin Academy

References

Towns in Rankin County, Mississippi
Towns in Mississippi
Jackson metropolitan area, Mississippi
Mississippi placenames of Native American origin